Alejandro Colunga Marín is a Mexican artist, painter and sculptor.

Early life 
He was born in Guadalajara on 11 December 1948 and studied architecture between 1967 and 1971 and music and hospitality in 1971–1973 at Conservatorio del Estado de Jalisco. Colunga's painting and sculpting abilities were self-taught.
He has also extensively studied anthropology and languages.

Career as painter and sculptor 
His work is characterized by the intensity of his vision and his passionate expressionism and gained international recognition.

His universe of imagination and his original working in the Latin American tradition of surrealism and fantasy . He has participated in many exhibitions, individually and collectively since 1968, in the United States, Mexico, Europe and South America. Some of his works of art form part of important private collections as well as museum collections. He works on ambitious sculptural projects in various countries as an example He has done  One well-known series of eight sculptures of his, The Rotunda by the Sea, is a collection of bronze chairs that were created for Puerto Vallarta's boardwalk (malecon).
And some huge sculptures at the Nassau County Museum in Long Island New york

Colunga has cited Rufino Tamayo as one artist who has influenced his work.
He studied architecture for thee years before dedicating himself to painting in 1971.

Art: paintings and sculptures

Individual exhibitions, trajectory, and awards 

1968
"La Galería", Guadalajara, Jalisco.
1969
Senior International, Guadalajara, Jalisco.
1972
Casa de la Cultura, Guadalajara, Jalisco.
1974 
Galería Doce, Guadalajara, Jalisco.
lithograph at Ernesto de Soto. San Francisco, California.
1975  
Lithographs at Kyron's ; studio with Andrew Vlady.               
Exposition Galería Franco Terranova, IPANEMA, Río de Janeiro, Brasil.
Galería O. M., Guadalajara, Jalisco.
1976 
Museo de Arte Moderno, Morelia Michoacán.
Museo de Arte Contemporáneo, Bahía, Brasil.
Galery Uno, Puerto Vallarta, Jalisco.
1977
Galeria Miró, Monterrey, N. L.
1978
This year He travels to Brasil, Europa, África and India.
1979
Galería Miró, Monterrey, N. L.
1980
Travels to Europe, with the purpose to  research and study.
Museo de Arte Moderno, Cd. De México, D. F.
Galería Hagerman Baños, México, D. F.
1981
Promoción de las Artes, Monterrey, N. L.
1982  
Museum of Modern Art, O.E.A., Washington, D. C.
Proyect sculptures  18 m high for S.I.N., New York, N.Y.
Galery at Mexican Embassy at Bern, Switzerland.
Galery  Mexican Embassy  en Zurich, Switzerland.
Galery Rudy Müller, Zurich, Suiza.
1984
Galeria de Arte Actual Mexicano, Monterrey, N. L.
1985 
Invited by Arts Meridian to a Simposium about Art for the Américas, by the Stanford University of San Francisco, Cal., U.S.A.
1987
Works in experimental Proyects Sculpture in terracotta cerámic glassed with Museum Jorge Wilmont.
1988
Award Minerva de las Artes, Guadalajara, Jalisco.
1989
Foire Internacional D´Art Contemporain Grand Palais, París, France. (FIAC)
1990
Foire Internacional D´Art Contemporain Grand Palais, París, France. (FIAC)
Dorsky Gallery, New York, N. Y., U.S.A.
1991
Foro Internacional Arte Contemporáneo, Bogotá, Colombia.
Conference about influences and trends in  Art.
1992 
Foro International  Contemporary Art, Caracas, Venezuela
Conference about Racism in Art.
International Forum of Contemporary Art, Bogotá, Colombia.
Workshop with young Colombian artists.
Invited as jury at International Movie Festival  Santa Fe de Bogotá, Colombia.
International Art Exposition, Miami, Fl., U.S.A.
Designs scenery and costumes for the play "Paraíso" for the Monterrey N.L Ballet.
1993 
Five Interactive Monumental Sculptures   "La sala de los magos".
Permanent Installation at the front of the Centro Cultural  Cabañas en la Plaza Tapatía. Guadalajara, Jalisco.
International Art Exposition, Miami, Fl., U.S.A.
Jansen Gallery, San Antonio, Texas, U.S.A.
Galery ARN, Zurich, Suiza.
1994    
Award Jalisco de las Artes, Guadalajara, Jal. México.
1995   
Award  Arquitecture for the  interactive installation, "La sala de los magos", Guadalajara, Jal.
94/95 Monumental Set of seven sculptures  "Los Magos que Esperan". Privat Financial Group . Guadalajara, Jal. México.
1997Set of 8 Monumental sculptures called "La Rotonda del Mar"
Permanent installation at the el malecón, Puerto Vallarta, Jal. México.
97/98    
Book about work of drawings big size. Guadalajara, Jal. México.
1998
Works in a Talavera project with utilitarian cerámic, Momic children jar, extraterrestrial children and furniture at the workshop  "Talavera de la Reina" Puebla, Pue.
Hall "Alejandro Colunga"  permanent exposition devoted to his work of art, Amparo Museum, Puebla, Pue.
Collection Group four pieces called "Sala de los Magos II". Patio central, Museo Amparo, Puebla, Pue. México.
1999 
Regional Museum, "Abrazo Ancestral", Guadalajara, Jal. México.
99/00   
Eight Monumental Sculptures Called "Los magos universales", Interaction Proyect. Plaza Tapatía, Guadalajara, Jal. México.
2000
Fountain "Los Magos del Sol" Set of five sculptures in bronze at the Plaza del Sol, Guadalajara, Jal. México.
Experiment about astronomy  with a  Traditional  Mexican chair (Equipal) with the coordination with the historiographer and researcher Martha Figueroa.
2001
Art and Fashion to tribute  Alejandro Colunga "La Noche de Los Magos" at the esplanade Centro Cultural Cabañas, Guadalajara, Jal.
2002    
Created the scenery, costumes, make-up and performance "Las Bodas del Cielo y El Infierno" theatrical play of William Blake at the Theater de las Artes at the Centro Nacional de las Artes at the Ciudad de México and Theater Degollado at Guadalajara, Jal. México.
Installs a Monumental  interactive sculpture, at the City Center Portland Oregon, U.S.A.
2003
Project for the new installation of 8 monumental sculptures for Puerto Vallarta, Jal.
2004
Exhibition at Galería Azul at Guadalajara.
2005 
Participation as actor at the film "Sincronía"  Guadalajara, Jal.
Installation of eight Monumental Sculptures, for the Nassau Country Museum, Long Island, New York                                                                                                                                                           
Designs a set of sculptures for the awards to the most renown Football team 
2006  
Book about his work at ediciones Espejo de Obsidiana, in México City.
Movie in process about his life and his work director from Rumania, Antoniu Moldovan.
Documentary about his trips, life and work by Mexican tapatío director Juan Pablo Angel Guggenbuehl.
Permanent Exposition  at the Nassau County Museum Collection, Long Island, New York.
Project of a set of Sculptures at the Los Magos Garden, based in games for children
Works in a set of engraving great size at the Workshop Guacha Bato in collaboration with Sergio Ruiz.
Recognition and Award at the Congress of the State of Jalisco, México.
Recognition at Radio University of Guadalajara at Puerto Vallarta, México.                                                       
2007
Working on monumental sculptures for the Nassau County Museum, Long Island New York.
Award  Galardón Nacional "Ocho Columnas de Oro". Guadalajara, México
2008
Exhibition "Maravillas y Pesadillas" Museo de las Artes de La Universidad de Guadalajara and Instituto Cultural Cabañas.
Tribute for his 40 years of trajectory, by the H. Ayuntamiento de Puerto Vallarta.
2010
Award Pedro Sarquís Merrewe Foundation

Award Guadalajara, given by the City of Guadalajara in a solemn City ceremony.

Collectors
Arizona State University Art Museum, Tempe, Arizona
Berardo Collection Museum, Lisbon, Portugal
San Antonio Museum of Art, San Antonio, Texas
Nassau County Museum of Art, Long Island, NY
Museo Amparo, Puebla, Mexico
Museo Cabañas, Guadalajara Jalisco

References

External links

Madona de los Tecolotes
Negrito Baila Zamba
Three Colungas at Galeria Dante
Alejandro Colunga, a Mexican Artist

Mexican surrealist artists
1948 births
Living people
Mexican contemporary artists
Artists from Guadalajara, Jalisco
20th-century Mexican painters
Mexican male painters
21st-century Mexican painters
20th-century Mexican sculptors
20th-century Mexican male artists
21st-century Mexican male artists